A supersonic business jet (SSBJ) is a business jet travelling above the speed of sound: a supersonic aircraft. Some manufacturers are designing or have been designing SSBJs, but none are currently available. Usually intended to transport about ten passengers, proposed SSBJs would be about the same size as subsonic business jets.

Only two commercial supersonic transports entered service: the Aérospatiale/British Aerospace Concorde and the Tupolev Tu-144. Both were designed with government subsidies and did not recoup development costs. They had high operating costs and high noise. The Boom Technology Overture is a smaller supersonic airliner project.

Some manufacturers believe these concerns can be addressed at a smaller scale, offering high speed transport for small groups of high-value passengers, executives or heads of state.
Current proposals include SAI Quiet Supersonic Transport and Spike S-512.
Former proposals include the Aerion SBJ, Aerion AS2, HyperMach SonicStar, Sukhoi-Gulfstream S-21 and Tupolev Tu-444.
Several companies, including Gulfstream Aerospace, work on sonic booms-mitigation technologies like the Quiet Spike.

Timeline

In 1997, Dassault Aviation was considering a Mach 1.8 supersonic business jet powered by three non-afterburning engines derived from subsonic aircraft, with a cabin similar to the Falcon 50, capable of flying between Paris and New York.
In September 2004, the European Commission selected the HISAC High Speed Aircraft program, launched with Dassault in 2005 and evaluating the feasibility of a small supersonic aircraft.
By 2019, Dassault was reserved about the prospects for a supersonic business jet.

In January 2018, Vladimir Putin proposed a civil SSBJ variant of the Tu-160 bomber, for a potential market of 20-30 units in Russia alone at $100-120 million each.
UAC previously studied a SSBJ, displaying a scale model at MAKS Air Show 2017, to be designed and built in seven years with an existing engine like the NK-32 and a titanium airframe, a limited production would be worth an expected $150 million price.

In August 2020, Virgin Galactic announced the design of a high speed delta wing aircraft for 9 to 19 people, targeting Mach 3 above , in partnership with Rolls-Royce plc for its propulsion.

Gallery

References

External links

 
 
 
 
 
 
 

 
Business aircraft
Business jet